Milly Bennett (May 22, 1897 – November 7, 1960) (born Mildred Jacqueline Bremler, also known as Mildred Mitchell and Mildred Amlie) was an American journalist and writer who covered political conditions in China, social conditions in the Soviet Union, the Spanish Civil War, and various events in the United States.

Personal life
Bennett was born on May 22, 1897 in San Francisco, California. She was graduated from Girls' High School in San Francisco in 1915 and then attended the College of Hawaii from 1915 to 1917.

In 1921 she married Mike Mitchell, but they were divorced in 1926. She moved to the USSR in 1931, and around that time she married Evgeni Konstantinov in Moscow. After Konstantinov was arrested for being a homosexual, she struggled to maintain her faith in the communist party. She visited him in his Siberian prison. They divorced in or before November 1936.

She lived in the USSR until December 1936 when she moved to Spain to fight the fascists. On December 1, 1937, she married Hans Amlie, a commander in the volunteer Abraham Lincoln Brigade and brother of Thomas Amlie. While in the USSR and briefly after she moved to Spain, she had an affair with Hermann Joseph Muller. She also had an affair in Moscow with Lindsay Parrott. While in Spain, Bennett had a brief love affair with Wallace Burton, an ex-pat fighting in the Spanish Civil War. Previously, while in China in the 1920s, she had an affair with his twin brother, Wilbur. She was pregnant while in Spain.

In January 1938, Bennett returned to the United States with Amlie. They set up a home in Mill Valley, California. She died in 1960.

Career
As a journalist and a writer, Bennett, who was born Mildred Jacqueline Bremler, worked around the world under the pseudonym Milly Bennett. She also used her married names for her bylines, Mildred Mitchell and Mildred Amlie. She spent much of her career producing propaganda for the English language newspapers of communist governments in the USSR and China.

Bennett was a reporter at The Daily News in San Francisco from 1917 to 1921 and at The Honolulu Star-Bulletin from 1921 to 1926. While in San Francisco, she covered the trial of Thomas Mooney.

She was then the editor of the Chung-Mei News Agency in Peking, China from 1926 to 1927. During the years 1927 to 1931, Bennett was a reporter for The Daily News, the Scripps-Howard News Service, and the United Press. She also worked on the Peoples Tribune in Hankow, China with Rayna Prohme. From 1931 to 1935, she was a reporter for the new Moscow News. For a time, she ran the Moscow bureau of the International News Service from her apartment.

In 1935 and 1936, she was a reporter for the Newspaper Enterprise Association, The New York Times, and the International News Service. In 1936 and 1937, she reported from Spain for the Associated Press, the United Press, and the London Times. She was also a staff member for the English-language section of the Press and Propaganda Service of the Spanish Government, working alongside her friend Kate Mangan. Taking the job in Spain allowed her to reclaim her ideals, instead of working for the "capitalist press," and to let her cover a war, which interested her personally.

In her memoir, On Her Own, Bennett describes living in the Soviet Union just before World War II broke out, living through the Spanish Civil War, life in China during the Northern Expedition, and her various other posts as a reporter. She also discusses her many love affairs and other highlights and disappointment in her life.

Communism
In late May 1937, her application for membership in the Communist Party of the United States was denied. Though she was instructed to wait until she had returned to the United States to apply again, she sent another application in October of that year while still in Spain. Though she attempted several times, she was never admitted as a party member.

After Bennett and Amlie returned to the United States, they were investigated and surveilled by the Federal Bureau of Investigation. The FBI believed Bennett to be a spy for the Spanish Republic.

Selected publications

Legacy
Bennett's papers are held at Stanford University's Hoover Institution. The 2020 novel, Salt the Snow by Carrie Callaghan follows the story of Bennett.

References

Works cited

1897 births
1960 deaths
People from San Francisco
People from Honolulu
American women journalists
University of Hawaiʻi alumni
American expatriates in China
American expatriates in the Soviet Union
American expatriates in Spain
American communists
People from Mill Valley, California